Ramakrishna Mission Vivekananda Educational and Research Institute, formerly Ramakrishna Mission Vivekananda University or simply Vivekananda University, is a  education institute deemed-to-be-university headquartered at Belur, West Bengal, with campuses spanning multiple states in India. Established with the idea of actualizing Swami Vivekananda's vision of education, the institute is administered by the Ramakrishna Mission. The university provides courses on subjects as varied as rural and tribal development, disability management and special education, fundamental science education and Indian cultural and spiritual heritage.

History

Ramakrishna Mission Vivekananda Educational and Research Institute was established with the idea of actualizing Swami Vivekananda's vision of education. It was declared as a de novo Deemed University by the Ministry of Human Resource Development, Government of India in 2005. With its headquarters at Belur, RKMVERI began functioning in July 2005 with one branch in the Specialized Faculty Centre at Coimbatore in the field of ‘Disability Management and Special Education’. In the following year, three new branches were added at Narendrapur, Ranchi and Kolkata (at Simla – the ancestral residence of Swami Vivekananda, currently operating under the Belur main campus).
 
Since then, two new schools have been established in the main campus, namely the School of Mathematical Sciences (focusing on mathematics, theoretical physics and theoretical computer science), and the School of Indian Heritage (including Sanskrit studies, ancient Indian heritage and Vedanta, especially the Upanishads and the Bhagavad Gita).

Accreditation

In 2019, the institute was accredited by the National Assessment and Accreditation Council with a grade of A++.

Highlights

 RKMVERI hosts a special UNESCO chair in the area of Inclusive Adapted Physical Education and Yoga. The chair was established in 2012.
 The Faculty of Disability Management and Special Education (FDMSE) at the Coimbatore campus has produced a comprehensive Indian Sign Language (ISL) dictionary addressing the communicative need of persons with hearing impairment. FDMSE also houses a Braille printing press.

Notable faculty
Mahan Maharaj (ex-faculty), awarded the 2011 Shanti Swarup Bhatnagar Prize for Science and Technology
Narasimhaiengar Mukunda (Distinguished Associate), Indian physicist,  Shanti Swarup Bhatnagar awardee

References

External links

 
Deemed universities in India
Universities and colleges in Howrah district
Universities and colleges affiliated with the Ramakrishna Mission
Educational institutions established in 2005
2005 establishments in West Bengal